Coalescence may refer to:

 Coalescence (chemistry), the process by which two or more separate masses of miscible substances seem to "pull" each other together should they make the slightest contact
 Coalescence (computer science), the merging of adjacent blocks of memory to fill gaps caused by deallocated memory
 Coalesced hashing, a strategy of hash collision resolution in computing
 Coalescence (genetics), the merging of genetic lineages backwards to a most recent common ancestor
 Coalescence (linguistics), the merging of two or more phonological segments into one
 Coalescence (physics), the merging of two or more droplets, bubbles or particles into one
 COALESCE, a SQL command that selects the first non-null from a range of values
 In geography, the process by which urban sprawl produces a linear conurbation
 Coalescence (Whit Dickey album), 2004
 Coalescence (Andre Canniere album), 2013
 Timer coalescing, a computer system energy-saving technique

See also 
 Coalesce (disambiguation)
 Coalescent, a science-fiction novel
 Coalescent theory, a model of how alleles sampled from a population may have originated from a common ancestor
 Coalescer